Luther W. Lindon (June 23, 1915 – April 21, 1988) was an American football tackle. He was drafted by the Cleveland Rams but never played a game for them. He played for the Detroit Lions from 1944 to 1945.

References

1915 births
1988 deaths
American football tackles
Kentucky Wildcats football players
Detroit Lions players
People from Magoffin County, Kentucky